Phabricator is a suite of web-based development collaboration tools, which includes Differential code review tool, Diffusion repository browser, Herald change monitoring tool, Maniphest bug tracker, Phriction wiki.

Phabricator integrates with Git, Mercurial, and Subversion. It is available as free software under the Apache License 2.0.

Phabricator was originally developed as an internal tool at Facebook overseen by Evan Priestley. Priestley left Facebook to continue Phabricator's development in a new company called Phacility.

On May 29, 2021, Phacility announced that it was ceasing operations and no longer maintaining Phabricator starting June 1, 2021. A community fork, Phorge, was created and announced its stable release to the public on September 7, 2022.

Notable users 

Phabricator's users include:

 AngularJS
 Asana
 Discord
 Dropbox
 Facebook
 FreeBSD
 GnuPG
 Khan Academy
 KDE
 Mozilla
 LLVM/Clang/LLDB (debugger)/LLD (linker)
 Lubuntu
 MemSQL
 Pinterest
 Quora
 Twitter
 Uber
 Wildfire Games
 Wikimedia

Gallery

See also 

 List of tools for code review

References

External links 
 
 
 
 
 Wikimedia Phabricator, used for Wikimedia and MediaWiki tasks (bug reports and feature requests).
 MediaWiki page about Phabricator, including user help

Facebook software
Software review
Free project management software
Free wiki software
Bug and issue tracking software
Help desk
 
Free software programmed in PHP
Software using the Apache license